A design process generates a conceptual solution for a problem stated in the form of requirements. Examples include:

 Responsibility-driven design (RDD)
 URDAD

ICONIX provides a complete software development process which incorporates a design process. Pure design methodologies can be plugged into software development processes like extreme programming and Rational Unified Process. A design process is usually followed by an implementation process which provides a concrete solution based on the design.

Software design